St Katherine Coleman was a parish church  in the City of London, situated in St Katherine's Row, on the south side of Fenchurch Street, in Aldgate Ward. Of medieval origin, it narrowly  escaped destruction in the Great Fire of London in 1666, but was rebuilt in the eighteenth century. The church closed in November 1926 and was demolished soon afterwards.

Dedication
The church was dedicated to St Catherine of Alexandria. The additional name "Coleman" was taken from  nearby  garden called "Colemanhaw". St Katherine's  was known earlier as "All Hallows Coleman-church."

History

Medieval church
The church was in existence by 1346, when the name of a rector is recorded. In about 1489, William White, then Lord Mayor, rebuilt or added the south aisle. There were repairs in 1620, and in 1624 a new gallery was constructed and a vestry added. There were further repairs in 1703. Hatton describes the architecture of the church as being "of the Gothic and Tuscan orders".

Eighteenth-century rebuilding
St Katherine's was demolished in 1734, and rebuilt in 1741 at the expense of the parish, to a "vernacular palladian" design by James Horne. Never regarded as one of the more spectacular City churches, the new building  was constructed of brick, with  window and door surrounds of rusticated stonework. The interior was a plain room, with a flat ceiling, coved at the sides,  ornamented with a single oval panel, with a flower at the centre. An arched recess at the east end accommodated the reredos. Beneath the church was a burial vault, entered through a door at the west end.

Demolition
The parish was designated  for amalgamation under the Union of Benefices Act 1860 but the church remained in use until 1926. The final service was held on 20 November, a joyous occasion (as reported in the City Press) after which it was quickly demolished. The gate piers and railings of the churchyard, which probably date from the 18th century survive, and the site of the churchyard itself is now a public garden, owned by Lloyd's Register of shipping. It was re-landscaped in 1996–2000. 
After the clearance of the graveyard, the burials were reinhumed at City of London Cemetery.

Money raised by the sale of the site was used to erect a new church in Hammersmith, initially called St Catherine Coleman, but now known as St Katherine Westway. The marble font from the City church is now at St Peter's, Grange Park, Enfield.

References

External links
 

14th-century establishments in England
1926 disestablishments in England
Buildings and structures demolished in 1926
Churches rebuilt after the Great Fire of London but since demolished
Demolished buildings and structures in London